La Rinconada is a municipality located in the province of Seville, Andalusia, Spain. According to the 2020 census (INE), the city has a population of 39,062 inhabitants.

References

External links
La Rinconada - Sistema de Información Multiterritorial de Andalucía

Municipalities of the Province of Seville